Kyaw Kyaw Naing  (born 1964) is a modern Burmese traditional musician who is trying to bring this music to the world stage. He is a master of the pat waing or saing waing, a traditional Burmese drum-circle instrument; the player sits in the middle of a horseshoe-shaped shell made of elaborately carved wood and decorated with gold leaf.

Bringing the Burmese Pat Waing to America 
Naing performed with Western musicians for the first time with the Bang on a Can All-Stars. In 2001, he performed on "The Bang on a Can Marathon Music" at the Brooklyn Academy of Music in New York City. In February 2002, he appeared at the Lincoln Center with the Bang on a Can All-Stars.

On December 13, 2003 at the Asia Society in Manhattan, Naing, together with 12 other musicians and 7 dancers, performed a full ensemble of Burmese traditional music and dance (Burmese orchestra) for the first time in almost 30 years. This performance was organized by Rachel Cooper of the Asia Society.

His CD, Bang on a Can Meets Kyaw Kyaw Naing, with special guest Todd Reynolds (formerly of ETHEL), is steeped in the Burmese tradition. The New York Times called his music "an exhilarating tease, defying expectations of symmetry or steady tempo."

Early life 
The last Burmese orchestra to play in New York City was in 1975 at the Asia Society, the organization says.  It was led by Naing's father, U Sein Chit Tee, who performed in Malaysia, Thailand, Singapore, the former Soviet Union, the United Kingdom and the United States.

Naing's father was teaching his elder brother to play the pat waing.  He remembers that, at the age of four years, he would sit and watch his older brother struggle to play during a lesson.  He learned to play quite well just from observing his father and brother. From then on, his father decided that Naing would study the pat waing and patala, and his brother would specialize in vocals.

Naing started learning the classical Burmese repertory at six years of age. He won second prize at a patala (bamboo xylophone) competition in Mandalay. Then he won first prize at the Burmese Era 3000 competition and some other prizes as well. His mother wanted very much for him to be a musician, but his father did not because of the hardships of a traditional musician's life.

Life in America 
In 1999, the University of California at Los Angeles (UCLA) invited Naing to give a performance. After visiting England, he came to Los Angeles along with musicians from other Asian and European countries. His intention was to stay for a short while and go home. But when he was at UCLA, he was amazed that Burmese music did not exist there. He saw musical instruments from many countries, but not a single Burmese musical instrument—not even a harp or a xylophone. He was inspired to introduce Burmese music to America and to help the Burmese community in the United States.

Many of the instruments and sets which have been shipped from Burma belong to Naing's family. He has slowly been building a career as a Burmese musician. Evan Ziporyn from Bang on a Can All-Stars invited him to a workshop at MIT. He has since performed with Bang on a Can and toured with a group from UCLA.

Naing said that, like jazz musicians, Burmese players "look at one another and listen to the tune and play accordingly... even though they might play the same piece of music, the next time they play it differently." When asked if it sounds anything like jazz, he laughed and said, "No, it's totally different."

As of 2005, Naing lived in Sunnyside, Queens, New York.

Burmese Traditional Musicians (Hsaing Waing ) 
In Burma, the hsaing waing percussion/gong ensemble for centuries, has been central to  musical and dramatic arts in Burmese culture. Hsaing musicians served the Burmese royal court in the past, and continue to perform in concerts of Bala Hsaing (instrumental music), Zat Hsaing (music for dance-drama troupe performances or  Zat Pwe), and Nat Hsaing (performances for the propitiation ceremonies of Nat spirits  or "Nat Pwe").

The leader of the Hsaing Waing plays a set of 21 pitched drums hung on a circle frame  known as the "pat waing".  The  most famous pat waing musician/composer  was Sein Beda  (1882-1942) who traveled to Ratanagiri, India to perform for King Thibaw -  deposed by the British in 1885 - lived.

References
 Burmese Encyclopedia, Vol. 4, P. 251 "Saing Saya" - printed in 1962.

External links 
 Ziporyn.com story
 Irrawaddy Publishing article
 Performers at Cantaloupe Music
 Interview with Kyaw Kyaw Naing

1964 births
American male musicians
Burmese musicians
Living people
Pat waing players
Burmese emigrants to the United States